Kilburn is a surname.  Notable people with the name include:

 Benjamin W. Kilburn (1827–1909), American photographer stereoscopic view publisher
 Clarence E. Kilburn (1893–1975), American politician, Republican member of the United States House of Representatives from New York
 Doug Kilburn (born 1930), Canadian ice hockey player
 Henry Franklin Kilburn (1844–1905), American architect
 Jim Kilburn (1909–1993), British sports journalist
 Jimmy Kilburn (1922–2008), Canadian ice hockey player
 John Kilburn (1876–1976), English-born Australian politician
 Lawrence Kilburn (1720–1775), First portrait painter in New York
 Melanie Kilburn (born 1956), English actress
 Peter Kilburn (died 1986), victim of the Lebanon hostage crisis
 Richard Kilburn (1942–2013), South African malacologist
 Sam Kilburn (1868–1940), English cricketer
 Samuel Smith Kilburn (1831–1903), American engraver
 Steve Kilburn (born 1963), Australian politician, Australian Labor Party member of the Legislative Assembly of Queensland
 Terry Kilburn (born 1926), English-American former child actor
 Tom Kilburn (1921–2001), British engineer and co-inventor of the first stored program computer
 William Kilburn (1745–1818), English illustrator for William Curtis' Flora Londinensis
 William Edward Kilburn (1818–1891), English photographer